Micah Gravley (born May 12, 1974) is an American politician who served in the Georgia House of Representatives from the 67th district from 2013 to 2023. The Georgia Recorder noted that Gravley was a "key figure in promoting medical cannabis legalization" in the state.

Gravley did not seek a sixth term and left the Georgia House in 2023; Lydia Glaize (D) won election to the seat.

References

1974 births
Living people
People from Douglasville, Georgia
21st-century American politicians